Sofie Bruun Bredgaard (born 18 January 2002) is a Danish football forward who plays for FC Rosengård of Sweden's Damallsvenskan. In April 2022 she won her first cap for the senior Denmark national team.

Club career
Bredgaard joined B 93 from BSF in 2017. The following year she scored for B 93 on her Kvindeligaen debut, in a 2–2 draw with Odense Q at Østerbro Stadium. In October 2017 she had spent a period training with Manchester City.

In July 2020 Bredgaard signed a two-and-a-half year contract with Swedish Damallsvenskan club Linköpings FC. She regretted leaving home before the completion of her education, but noted that the pay and conditions for female footballers were much better in Sweden than Denmark. After playing in Linköpings' first match of the 2022 Damallsvenskan season, Bredgaard signed for FC Rosengård on 31 March 2022, the final day of the transfer window.

International career
Bredgaard won her first cap for the Denmark national team on 12 April 2022, in a 2–0 2023 FIFA World Cup qualification – UEFA Group E win over Azerbaijan at Viborg Stadium. She entered play as a 77th-minute substitute for Sofie Svava.

International goals

References

External links

Profile at Danish Football Association 

2002 births
Living people
Danish women's footballers
Denmark women's international footballers
Women's association football midfielders
FC Rosengård players
Danish expatriate women's footballers
Danish expatriate sportspeople in Sweden
Linköpings FC players
Damallsvenskan players
UEFA Women's Euro 2022 players

Denmark international footballers
Expatriate women's footballers in Sweden
Association football midfielders